Gamal Haress (12 August 1925 – October 2015) was an Egyptian equestrian. He competed at the 1952 Summer Olympics, the 1956 Summer Olympics and the 1960 Summer Olympics.

References

1925 births
2015 deaths
Egyptian male equestrians
Olympic equestrians of Egypt
Equestrians at the 1952 Summer Olympics
Equestrians at the 1956 Summer Olympics
Equestrians at the 1960 Summer Olympics
Sportspeople from Cairo